Roosendaal is both a city and a municipality in the southern Netherlands, in the province of North Brabant.

Towns/villages of the municipality 
 Roosendaal (population: 66,760)
 Wouw (4,920)
 Heerle (1,900)
 Nispen (1,440)
 Wouwse Plantage (1,230)
 Moerstraten (660)

The city of Roosendaal
Under King Louis Bonaparte of the Kingdom of Holland, Roosendaal received city rights in 1809.

Nispen merged with Roosendaal to form the municipality Roosendaal en Nispen. On 1 January 1997 the municipalities Roosendaal en Nispen and Wouw merged into the municipality now simply known as Roosendaal.

History

Roosendaal goes back to the 12th and 13th century.  The name Rosendaele was first mentioned in a document of 1268.  Roosendaal was always a part of North Brabant. In the Middle Ages, Roosendaal grew as a result of the turf business, but the Eighty Years' War (1568–1648) put an end to the growth as Roosendaal and Wouw were suffering from itinerant combat troops that plundered and ravaged everything they came across. For decades the countryside of Roosendaal was abandoned.

Sports
The leading football team of Roosendaal is RBC.

Military
The Korps Commandotroepen have their headquarters and main garrison, the Engelbrecht van Nassaukazerne, in Roosendaal. 
The Royal Marechaussee used to have a brigade in the city. The first brigade was placed in the city on 16 July 1818 and was disbanded on 1 March 1943. On 2 September 1946 the brigade returned to the city, to be disbanded again on 1 September 1989. The Marechaussee would keep a small office on the railway station, due to the station being one of few to directly lead into Belgium.

Transport 
 Railway station: Roosendaal

The city serves as a regional railway hub: the Zwolle-Roosendaal Intercity service starts and ends here, the IC from Amsterdam to Vlissingen (Flushing) stops at the station, as did the international Intercity train from Amsterdam to Brussels until 2018, when that train was rerouted via Breda and the HSL-Zuid. There is still an hourly stop-train service to Antwerp.

Medical care 
The Bravis Ziekenhuis Roosendaal is the main general hospital for residents of Roosendaal and surrounding areas.  Bravis Ziekenhuis offers specialised medical care provided by a broad team of medical specialists.  Special units include: Cardiology, Dermatology, Gynaecology, Oncology, Ophthalmology and Intensive Care.

Events in Roosendaal
 Carnaval
 Draai van de Kaai cycling race
 Annual "International ABBA Day" – A weekend-long event, normally each April, operated by ABBA's official Fan Club which is based in Roosendaal.

Notable residents

 Cornelis of Glymes (1458 in Wouw – 1508/1509), Admiral of the Netherlands
 Hendrick Lonck (1568–1634), first Dutch sea captain to reach the New World
 Léon Orthel (1905–1985), classical pianist and composer
 Fons Rademakers (1920–2007), actor, film director, film producer and screenwriter
 Jean Defraigne (1929-2016), Belgian liberal politician
 Jack Jersey (1941–1997), singer-songwriter and producer of light music
 Joe de Bruyn (born 1949), Australian trade union official 
 Ad Konings (born 1956), ichthyologist, researches African rift lake cichlids
 Joost Lagendijk (born 1957), politician and former journalist and MEP
 Ben van Beurden (born 1958), CEO, Royal Dutch Shell plc
 Ronny Moorings (born 1961), musician, works with darkwave band Clan of Xymox 
 Frans Bauer (born 1973), singer of Dutch Schlager music
 Jeroen van Koningsbrugge (born 1973), actor, comedian, singer, director and presenter
 Harmen Fraanje (born 1976), jazz pianist and composer
 Jesse Klaver (born 1986), political leader of GreenLeft

Sport 

 Harry Broos (1898–1954), sprinter, team bronze medallist in the 1924 Summer Olympics 
 Antoine Mazairac (1901–1966), cyclist, silver medallist in the 1928 Summer Olympics
 George Knobel (1922–2012), football manager
 Theo Laseroms (1940–1991), footballer, over 400 club caps
 Jacques van Meer (born 1958), retired cyclist, competed at the 1980 Summer Olympics
 Jolanda van Dongen (born 1966), road racing cyclist, national time trial champion, 2003
 Henk Vos (born 1968), footballer with 600 club caps, now a coach
 Ingrid van Lubek (born 1971), triathlete, competed at the 2000 Summer Olympics
 Bram Lomans (born 1975), hockey player, twice team gold medallist at the 1996 and 2000 Summer Olympics
 Tim van Rijthoven (born 1997), tennis player
 Niek van der Velden (born 2000), snowboarder & 2017 Roosendaal Sportsman of the Year

Gallery

References

External links 

 

 
Populated places in North Brabant
Municipalities of North Brabant
Municipalities of the Netherlands established in 1997
Cities in the Netherlands

lt:Rozendalis